The 2011 Dwars door Vlaanderen was the 66th edition of the Dwars door Vlaanderen cycle race and was held on 23 March 2011. The race started in Roeselare and finished in Waregem. The race was won by Nick Nuyens.

General classification

References

2011
2011 in road cycling
2011 in Belgian sport
March 2011 sports events in Europe